Maura Sullivan is an American politician, veteran and former government official. Sullivan previously served as an official in the Obama Administration from 2014 to 2016 in both the Veterans Administration and the U.S. Department of Defense. She also served on the American Battle Monuments Commission starting in 2010, and began her career as an officer in the United States Marine Corps serving in the Iraq War after the September 11th attacks.

Sullivan ran for Congress as a Democrat in New Hampshire's 1st congressional district, which includes Manchester, Portsmouth, and Lake Winnipesaukee. On September 11, 2018 she lost her primary race for the 1st congressional district to Chris Pappas of Manchester, NH.

Early life and education 
Sullivan attended Northwestern University on an ROTC scholarship. Sullivan then served as a logistics officer in the U.S. Marine Corps, reaching the rank of captain, and her deployments included time in Okinawa, Japan, and Fallujah, Iraq. She earned the Navy Commendation Medal and a Navy / Marine Corps Achievement Medal with a Gold Star.

Following her military service, Sullivan attended Harvard Kennedy School and Harvard Business School. She graduated in 2009 and worked at PepsiCo in management roles across New England.

Public service 
In 2010, Sullivan was named to the American Battle Monuments Commission. On October 1, 2014, President Obama appointed Sullivan Assistant Secretary of Veterans Affairs for the Office of Public & Intergovernmental Affairs. At the VA, Sullivan was the principal public affairs advisor to Secretary Robert A. McDonald.

On June 22, 2015, Sullivan was named Assistant to the Secretary of Defense for Public Affairs, where she led communications policy for the Department of Defense.

Political career

2018 congressional election 
On October 23, 2017 Sullivan announced that she would run for Congress in New Hampshire's 1st congressional district less than three months after moving to the state.  Since entering the race, Sullivan has raised over $1.5 million and is endorsed by EMILY's List, Serve America, New Politics, WithHonor.org, and Vote Vets. She was the first to go on air with TV advertisements, highlighting her military and government experience.

During her campaign, Sullivan has been endorsed by Seth Moulton, a fellow Marine Corps veteran and Congressman from Massachusetts. She was also endorsed by Kathleen Sebelius, the former Health and Human Services Secretary in the Obama administration and former Governor of Kansas.

Sullivan lost the Democratic primary, on September 11, 2018, to Chris Pappas.

Political positions 

Sullivan has stated that her top policy priorities include fighting President Trump on matters of national security, ensuring access to affordable healthcare, improving conditions for veterans and military families, and addressing the opioid epidemic.

References

United States Marine Corps officers
Obama administration personnel
Northwestern University alumni
Harvard University alumni
New Hampshire Democrats
1979 births
Living people